The 1973 Penn State Nittany Lions football team represented Pennsylvania State University in the 1973 NCAA Division I football season. Penn State's third undefeated season under Joe Paterno was led by John Cappelletti who would become the first Penn State player to win the Heisman Trophy.

Schedule

Roster

Game summaries

Navy

Penn State capitalized on a fumble and two short punts to score three second-quarter touchdowns and break the game wide open against Navy. The Nittany Lions opened scoring with just one second left in the first as QB Tom Shuman hit SE Gary Heyman for a touchdown to cap an 88-yard drive. On the first play after the ensuing kickoff, E Greg Murphy recovered a fumble by RB Bob Jackson at the Navy 41, and the Lions took two-and-a-half minutes and five plays to score again. Penn State scored on two more quick drives of 60 and 51 yards following short punts into a stiff wind by John Stufflebeem.  The Lions added a field goal by Chris Bahr midway through the third and backup QB John Clark capped a 56-yard drive with a keeper to put Penn State ahead 37-0.  The final points of the contest came when a snap from Navy's center sailed over Stufflebeem's head and out of the end zone for a safety.

Syracuse

Statistics

Passing

Post season

NFL Draft
Ten Nittany Lions were drafted in the 1974 NFL Draft.

Awards
 John Cappelletti
Heisman Trophy
Maxwell Award
Walter Camp Award

References

Penn State
Penn State Nittany Lions football seasons
Lambert-Meadowlands Trophy seasons
Orange Bowl champion seasons
College football undefeated seasons
Penn State Nittany Lions football